Pukaki Lagoon, located in the suburb of Māngere, New Zealand, is one of the volcanoes in the Auckland volcanic field. The lagoon, alongside Māngere Lagoon, Waitomokia, Crater Hill, Kohuora and Robertson Hill, is one of the volcanic features collectively referred to as Nga Tapuwae a Mataoho ("The Sacred Footprints of Mataoho"), referring to the deity in Tāmaki Māori myths who was involved in their creation.

Pukaki Lagoon has a 600 m wide explosion crater, with a surrounding tuff ring. After an eruption about 65,000 yrs ago the crater filled with freshwater and became a lake. It was breached by the sea as sea-levels rose after the end of the last ice age about 8,000 yrs ago and became a tidal lagoon. This was dammed and drained and used as a speedway from 1929 into the 1930s (Henning's Speedway). It is now farmland.

References

City of Volcanoes: A geology of Auckland - Searle, Ernest J.; revised by Mayhill, R.D.; Longman Paul, 1981. First published 1964. .
Volcanoes of Auckland: The Essential Guide. Hayward, B.W., Murdoch, G., Maitland, G.; Auckland University Press, 2011.
Volcanoes of Auckland: A Field Guide. Hayward, B.W.; Auckland University Press, 2019, 335 pp. .

External links
 Photo of Henning's Speedway.
 Photographs of Pukaki Lagoon held in Auckland Libraries' heritage collections.

Auckland volcanic field
Māngere-Ōtāhuhu Local Board Area